Jumeirah Creekside Park is a group of two towers in Dubai Healthcare City in Dubai, United Arab Emirates. The towers are Jumeirah Creekside Park Residence and Jumeirah Creekside Park Hotel. Construction was expected to be completed in 2008 but is now on hold.

The two towers will be managed by the Dubai-based hotelier Jumeirah.  The hotel tower will contain 439 rooms and suites while the residential tower will have 406 apartments.

See also
 List of tallest buildings in Dubai
 List of buildings in Dubai

References

External links
 Jumeirah Al Khor on Emporis.com

Proposed skyscrapers in Dubai
Buildings and structures under construction in Dubai